The 2018 Road to the Kentucky Derby was a series of races through which horses qualified for the 2018 Kentucky Derby, which was held on May 5. The field for the Derby was limited to 20 horses, with up to four 'also eligibles' in case of a late withdrawal from the field. There were three separate paths for horses to take to qualify for the Derby: the main Road consisting of 34 races in North America plus one in Dubai, the Japan Road consisting of three races in Japan, and a new European Road consisting of seven races in England, Ireland and France.

The races in the Road to the Kentucky Derby were held from September 2017 (when the horses were age two) through April 2018 (when they had turned three). The top four finishers in the specified races earned points, with the highest point values awarded in the major preparatory races held in late March or early April. Earnings in non-restricted stakes acted as a tie breaker.

Changes from 2017 series
For 2018, several changes were made from the 2017 series:
 Race changes: Added the Springboard Mile to the main series. Added a third race to the Japan series.
 Points system changes: Jeff Ruby Steaks, formally the Spiral Stakes moved to a "Wild Card" race, along with the Lexington Stakes. Points for these races will now be awarded on 20-8-4-2 basis, which is a decrease for the Jeff Ruby and an increase for the Lexington 
 Rules changes: European Road to the Kentucky Derby introduced on a similar basis to the Japan Road. Consists of seven races, four of them on the turf and three on a synthetic surface.

The Delta Downs Jackpot Stakes, which would have been the 36th race in the main series, was cancelled in the aftermath of Hurricane Harvey.

Main Road to the Kentucky Derby

Standings

The following table shows the points earned in the eligible races for the main series. Entries for the Derby were taken on May 1.

Winner of Kentucky Derby in bold
 Entrants for Kentucky Derby in blue
 "Also eligible" for Kentucky Derby in green
 Sidelined/Not under Derby Consideration/Not nominated in gray

Prep season events

Note: 1st=10 points; 2nd=4 points; 3rd=2 points; 4th=1 point (except the Breeders' Cup Juvenile: 1st=20 points; 2nd=8 points; 3rd=4 points; 4th=2 point)

Championship series events

First leg of series
Note: 1st=50 points; 2nd=20 points; 3rd=10 points; 4th=5 points

Second leg of series
These races are the major preps for the Kentucky Derby, and are thus weighted more heavily. Note: 1st=100 points; 2nd=40 points; 3rd=20 points; 4th=10 points

"Wild Card" events
Note: 1st=20 points; 2nd=8 points; 3rd=4 points; 4th=2 point

Japan Road to the Kentucky Derby

The Japan Road to the Kentucky Derby is intended to provide a place in the Derby starting gate to the top finisher in the series. If the connections of that horse decline the invitation, their place is offered to the second-place finisher and so on through the top four finishers. If neither of the top four accept, this place in the starting gate reverts to the horses on the main road to the Derby. Eligible Earnings, defined as career earnings through April 14, 2018,  serves as the tie-break if two or more horses have the same number of points. For 2018, none of the invitations was accepted.

Qualification Table
The top four horses (colored brown within the standings) are eligible to participate in the Kentucky Derby provided the horse is nominated.

^ - not nominated

~ - declined offer to participate

Events

Note: Cattleya Sho and Zen-Nippon Nisai Yushun: 1st=10 points; 2nd=4 points; 3rd=2 points; 4th=1 points
Note: Hyacinth: 1st=30 points; 2nd=12 points; 3rd=6 points; 4th=3 points

European Road to the Kentucky Derby

The European Road to the Kentucky Derby is designed on a similar basis to the Japan Road and is intended to provide a place in the Derby starting gate to the top finisher in the series. If the connections of that horse decline the invitation, their place is offered to the second-place finisher and so on. If neither of the top four accept, this place in the starting gate reverts to the horses on the main road to the Derby. Eligible Earnings, defined as non-restricted stakes earnings through April 14, 2018,  serves as the tie-break if two or more horses have the same number of points. If non-restricted stakes earnings happen to be identical, career earnings through April 14, 2018 would be used to break the tie.

The series consists of seven races – four run on the turf in late 2017 when the horses are age two, plus three races run on a synthetic surface in early 2018.

Qualification Table
The following table shows the points earned in the eligible races for the European series. The top four horses (colored brown within the standings) were eligible for the invitation to participate in the Kentucky Derby, provided the horse was nominated. The connections of Gronkowski, who finished first with 50 points, accepted the invitation but Gronkowski subsequently became ill and had to miss the race. The second place finisher, Mendelssohn, separately qualified on the main Road by winning the UAE Derby.

Events

Points offered:
 the four races in 2017 for two-year-olds: 1st=10 points; 2nd=4 points; 3rd=2 points; 4th=1 points
 the first two races in 2018: 1st=20 points; 2nd=8 points; 3rd=4 points; 4th=2 points
 the Burradon Stakes: 1st=30 points; 2nd=12 points; 3rd=6 points; 4th=3 points

See also
2018 Kentucky Derby
2018 Road to the Kentucky Oaks

Notes

References

External links

Road to the Kentucky Derby, 2018
Road to the Kentucky Derby
Road to the Kentucky Derby